The 1970 Cal State Hayward Pioneers football team represented California State College at Hayward—now known as California State University, East Bay—as a member of the Far Western Conference (FWC) during the 1970 NCAA College Division football season. Led by Les Davis in his fifth and final year as head coach, Cal State Hayward compiled an overall record of 7–4 with a mark of 3–1 in conference play, sharing the FWC title with Chico State. The team outscored its opponents 382 to 187 for the season. The Pioneers played home games at Pioneer Stadium in Hayward, California.

Davis resigned from his post at Cal State Hayward in February 1971 to become the head football coach at New Mexico Highlands University. In five years under Davis, the Pioneers won the conference title once (1969), shared the conference title once (1970) and finished with an overall record of 30–20–1, for a .598 winning percentage. Of the four coaches Cal State Hayward football had in its 29 years of existence, Davis is the only one finished his tenure with a winning record.

Schedule

References

Cal State Hayward
Cal State Hayward Pioneers football seasons
Northern California Athletic Conference football champion seasons
Cal State Hayward Pioneers football